Thomas I (1239–1296) was the fourth Marquess of Saluzzo from 1244 to his death. He was the son of Manfred III and Beatrice of Savoy.  He succeeded his father Manfred III.  He was also the grandson of Amadeus IV, Count of Savoy.

Biography
Under the reign of Thomas, Saluzzo blossomed, achieving a greatness which had eluded his ancestors. He crafted a state the borders of which remained unchanged for over two centuries. He extended the march to include Carmagnola. He was often at odds with Asti and he was a prime enemy of Charles of Anjou and his Italian pretensions. During his tenure, he made Saluzzo a free city, giving it a podestà to govern in his name. He defended his castles and roccaforti (strongholds) vigorously and built many new ones in the cities.

Marriage & issue
He married Luisa of Ceva. They had:
Manfred IV, succeeded his father
Alice of Saluzzo, who married Richard Fitzalan, 8th Earl of Arundel

References

Sources

1296 deaths
Thomas 1
1239 births
Aleramici